"Leaving Louisiana in the Broad Daylight" is a song written by Rodney Crowell and Donivan Cowart.  The song was initially covered by Emmylou Harris (in whose band Crowell had played during the late 1970s), who included it on her 1978 Quarter Moon in a Ten Cent Town album.

Content
A story of unhappy love of a girl.

Recording by The Oak Ridge Boys
The Oak Ridge Boys released the song in December 1979 as the third single from their album The Oak Ridge Boys Have Arrived.  "Leaving Louisiana in the Broad Daylight" was The Oak Ridge Boys' second number one country single, remaining at number one for a single week in February of 1980, spending a total of eleven weeks on the chart.

Chart performance

References

Songs about Louisiana
1979 singles
1978 songs
Emmylou Harris songs
The Oak Ridge Boys songs
Songs written by Rodney Crowell
Song recordings produced by Ron Chancey
MCA Records singles